Diversions for Piano Left Hand and Orchestra, Op. 21, is a concertante music composition by Benjamin Britten.

History 
Britten wrote the work for the Viennese-born pianist Paul Wittgenstein, who lost his right arm in World War I. Britten met Wittgenstein in New York in July 1940 and sketched the piece in August at Owl's Head, Maine. Although Wittgenstein complained about the orchestration, Britten initially declined to make any changes but later agreed to a few small alterations. Forever after, he felt bitter about them, and after 1950 he revised the score "to create an official version that would stop Paul playing it by rendering his version obsolete." Wittgenstein retained the performing rights for a good number of years, which kept other pianists from performing the work.

Wittgenstein played the premiere of Diversions with the Philadelphia Orchestra under the baton of Eugene Ormandy on 16 January 1942.  The Philadelphia reviewers commented more on Wittgenstein and his work as a one-armed pianist than on the composition itself. The Philadelphia Record did describe the score as "ingeniously written", while Musical America commented on the presence of both "pleasurable and dull moments" in the work.

Music 

The piece is in the form of a theme and 11 variations:
 Theme
 Variation I, Recitative
 Variation II, Romance
 Variation III, March
 Variation IV, Rubato
 Variation V, Chorale
 Variation VI, Nocturne
 Variation VII, Badinerie
 Variation VIII, Ritmico
 Variation IXa, Toccata I
 Variation IXb, Toccata II
 Variation X, Adagio
 Variation XI, Tarantella.

Britten utilised music that he wrote for a production of J. B. Priestley's Johnson over Jordan as source material for the work.  Lyn Henderson has noted the influence of Prokofiev-like rhythms in Variation IXa.  Christopher Mark has discussed Britten's use of the circle of fifths in various works, including the Diversions.

Recordings 
 Decca LXT 2981 (original LP): Julius Katchen, pianist; London Symphony Orchestra; Benjamin Britten, conductor
 Desto Records DC-7168 (original LP): Leon Fleisher, pianist; Baltimore Symphony Orchestra; Sergiu Comissiona, conductor
 Sony Classical SK 48188 (1992 CD): Leon Fleisher, pianist; Boston Symphony Orchestra; Seiji Ozawa, conductor
 EMI Classics: Peter Donohoe, pianist; City of Birmingham Symphony Orchestra; Sir Simon Rattle, conductor

References

Sources

See also 
 List of works for piano left-hand and orchestra

Concertos by Benjamin Britten
Commissions by Paul Wittgenstein
1940 compositions
Concertos for piano left-hand and orchestra